The SUIT sight is a 4× telescopic sight with tritium-powered illumination, utilised at dusk or dawn. The full name is the L2A2 Sight Unit Infantry Trilux. The sight is not designed as a sniper sight, but as a standard issue infantry sight to improve the infantryman's night fighting capability and to assist target identification at long range in daylight and in poor light conditions. The sight was mounted on the L1A1 Self-Loading Rifle or GPMG. It was first produced in 1976 by Avimo Ltd. in London, England.

Use

The sight is an optional optical sighting system for the British Army's L1A1 Self-Loading Rifle and was also used by the Australians and New Zealanders.

The sight has a lever to change between a short range mode (300 meters) and a long range mode (500 meters).

A similar unit known as the SUSAT was fitted to the SA80 series weapons.

Reticle
The reticle of the SUIT sight is of unusual design. Unlike the traditional crosshair layouts commonly used, which are in essence a cross intersecting the target, the SUIT has a single obelisk-shaped post protruding from the top edge of the sight so as not to obscure the target.  The reticle is tritium-illuminated for low-light condition aiming. The radioactive tritium light source has to be replaced every 8–12 years, since it gradually loses its brightness due to radioactive decay.

Manufacturing
The SUIT sight has an aluminium body, into which the eyepiece, objective lens and prisms are fitted as assemblies.

The SUIT sight was developed in the United Kingdom by Royal Armaments Research Development Establishment (RARDE) and is manufactured by Avimo Ltd., now known as Thales UK.

Specifications
SUIT L2A2
Overall dimensions: (L x W x H): 188 x 76 x 69 mm
Weight: 340 grams
Magnification: 4×
Field of view: 8 degrees (140 mils)
Objective diameter: 25.5 mm
Exit pupil: 6.375 mm
Eye relief: 35 mm
Light permeability: 86%
Reticle illumination: Red tritium, glass ampoule
Illumination strength: Adjustable
Tritium ampoule lifetime: 8–12 years
Range Settings: 300 meters (rear) or 500 meters (forward).  
NATO Stock Number (NSN): 1240-99-964-7647 (Sight Unit Infantry Trilux (SUIT) L2A2)

See also
SUSAT

References

Firearm sights
British Army equipment
Military equipment introduced in the 1970s